The 2018 Angola Basketball Super Cup (25th edition) was contested by Benfica do Libolo, as the 2017 league champion and Interclube, the 2017 cup runner-up (Libolo was the cup winner as well). Interclube beat Libolo 82-79 to win its first title ever.

2018 Men's Super Cup

2018 Women's Super Cup

See also
 2016 Angola Basketball Cup
 2016 BIC Basket
 2018 Victorino Cunha Cup

References

Angola Basketball Super Cup seasons
Super Cup